Weighing the Fleece is a 1921 painting by Australian artist George Washington Lambert. It is part of the collection of the National Gallery of Australia in Canberra.

Composition
The painting depicts "the interior of a woolshed with the owner and his wife watching the fleece being weighed, a shorn stud ram and an unshorn one." The painting has a basic triangular form—"almost a frieze inside a pediment"—with the scales at the apex of the triangle.
 

Lambert claimed to have had the painting in mind for 25 years, a period that suggests it may be a riposte to Tom Roberts' Shearing the Rams. Jim Davidson stated that "Certainly it could not be more different in spirit: instead of the celebration of strong masculine labour, this painting endorses wealth and the social order."

Lambert painted the work in 8 days. Despite this Lambert was proud of the attention to detail in the work such as the "beams and the swallow droppings on the beams, corrugated iron, oil drum, kerosene tin, wool bale, brand on the wool bale" that created "a masterpiece of small portrait grouping".

Provenance
The painting was commissioned by Leigh Sadlier Falkiner, the owner of Wanganella station, near Deniliquin in the Riverina region of New South Wales. The locality of Wanganella was later named for the station.  Despite commissioning the work, Falkiner disliked the way he and his wife, Beatrice, were portrayed by Lambert and declined to purchase the painting. The painting was later sold to Sir Baldwin Spencer for £600. 

It was acquired by the National Gallery of Australia in 1966.

Reception
Contemporary critics were largely favourable of the painting, although some claimed it lacked emotion and sympathy for the subject.

References

External links
Weighing the Fleece - National Gallery of Australia collection.

Paintings by George Washington Lambert
Collections of the National Gallery of Australia
1921 paintings
Sheep in art
Deniliquin